The S. H. Kress and Co. Building, a historic building located at 475 Central Avenue at the corner of 5th Street S. in downtown St. Petersburg, Florida. It was built in 1927 in the classical Commercial style influenced by the Beaux-Arts movement.  The building operated as a "five and-dime" store from 1927 until the company closed it c.1981.

The building is located within the Downtown St. Petersburg Historic District, and was added to the National Register of Historic Places on October 1, 2001.

Gallery

References

External links

 Pinellas County listings at National Register of Historic Places
 S.H. Kress and Co. Building at Florida's Office of Cultural and Historical Programs

National Register of Historic Places in Pinellas County, Florida
Buildings and structures in St. Petersburg, Florida
S. H. Kress & Co.
1927 establishments in Florida
Chicago school architecture in Florida
Commercial buildings completed in 1927